"Mariposa" (Spanish for butterfly) is a single by the Bay Area collective Peach Tree Rascals, released on August 28, 2019 by Homemade Projects and 10K Projects. The song went viral on TikTok, being used for more than 1.6 million videos, and peaked at 2 on the Billboard Hot Alternative Songs chart.

Background and composition
"Mariposa" was created because of member Joseph Barros's love of guitar. The framework for the song was completed in nearly a day. The group cited Yosemite National Park as a key role in the song's production, with the title being a reference to both Mariposa Grove and metamorphosis. The reference to metamorphosis represents growing as a human. The group recorded the song in a wooden shed. The saxophone outro was recorded by Dominic Pizano's friend Francis Salamanca.

The music video was released on the same day of the song's release. The acoustic version of the song was released on July 17, 2020.

Chart performance
"Mariposa" peaked at number 14 on the Billboard Hot Rock & Alternative Songs chart. The song also charted in Brazil, Indonesia, Malaysia, and the Philippines, Singapore, South Korea, Taiwan, Thailand, and Vietnam.

Charts

Weekly charts

Year-end charts

References

2019 singles
Peach Tree Rascals songs
2019 songs